The C.E. Forrester House is a historic house at 140 Danville Road in Waldron, Arkansas.  It is a two-story wood frame I-house, with an attached single-story wing extending from the rear of the center, giving it a common T-shaped plan.  The original front facade has a two-story gable-roofed porch extending across part of it, while the south-facing side of the wing, now serving as the main entrance, has a vernacular Craftsman-style porch with a shed roof extending along its length.  The house was built in 1896, with the wing added by 1904; it was built by Charlie Forrester, an Arkansas native who operated a number of retail and commercial business in Waldron.

The house was listed on the National Register of Historic Places in 1998.

See also
National Register of Historic Places listings in Scott County, Arkansas

References

Houses on the National Register of Historic Places in Arkansas
Houses completed in 1896
Houses in Scott County, Arkansas
National Register of Historic Places in Scott County, Arkansas